Aue may refer to:
 Aue (toponymy), a frequent element in German toponymy meaning "wetland; river island; river"

Places
 Aue, Saxony, a mining town in Saxony, Germany
 Aue (Samtgemeinde), a collective municipality in Uelzen District, Lower Saxony, Germany
 Aue, a village in Bad Berleburg, Siegen-Wittgenstein, North Rhine-Westphalia, Germany

Rivers in Lower Saxony, Germany
(each a tributary of the river in brackets)
 Aue (Elbe)
 Aue (Leine)
 Aue (Oste)
 Aue (Suhle)
 Aue (Weser)
 Große Aue

People 

 Hartmann von Aue, medieval German poet of Middle High German literature
 Paul Aue (1891–1945), World War I aviator and Nazi officer

Acronyms
 A.U.E., a Russian youth criminal organisation
 alt.usage.english, a newsgroup in Usenet
 American University in the Emirates
 Australian English or AuE
 Andrew User Environment, the user interface of the Andrew Project's Andrew User Interface System

Other uses
 Abu Rudeis Airport, IATA code